The 1921 Drexel Dragons football team represented Drexel Institute—now known as Drexel University—in the 1921 college football season. Led by William McAvoy in his second and final season as head coach, the team compiled a record of 2–3–1.

Schedule

Roster

References

Drexel
Drexel Dragons football seasons
Drexel Dragons football